Invasion is an American science fiction television series created by Shaun Cassidy.  It originally aired on ABC from September 21, 2005 through May 17, 2006. Somewhat similar to Invasion of the Body Snatchers, the show told the story of the aftermath of a hurricane in which water-based creatures infiltrate a small Florida town and begin to take over the bodies of the town's inhabitants through a cloning process (by first merging with then replacing them). It stars an ensemble cast featuring William Fichtner, Eddie Cibrian, Kari Matchett, Lisa Sheridan, Tyler Labine, Alexis Dziena, Evan Peters and Ariel Gade. The show was produced by Shaun Cassidy Productions and Warner Bros. Television.

Due to Hurricane Katrina in 2005 and the aftermath in the southern United States, early on-air promotions were quickly pulled by ABC. The advertising then switched emphasis completely to the alien invasion aspect of the series, while the hurricane received no mention. The premiere was also preceded with a warning that the show featured images of a fictional hurricane, to which viewers could be sensitive.

Invasion received critical acclaim, with the performances of the cast, the writing and the musical score being singled out for praise. The series was officially canceled on May 17, 2006. Since then, the show has appeared in numerous lists of shows that were "Cancelled Too Soon", including lists by Entertainment Weekly and The Huffington Post. The show was originally conceived for 5 seasons.

Cast and characters 
 William Fichtner as Sheriff Tom Underlay
 Eddie Cibrian as Russell Varon
 Kari Matchett as Dr. Mariel Underlay
 Lisa Sheridan as Larkin Groves
 Tyler Labine as Dave Groves
 Alexis Dziena as Kira Underlay
 Evan Peters as Jesse Varon
 Nathan Baesel as Lewis Sirk (recurring guest star)
 David Huynh as Sun Kim (recurring guest star)
 Ariel Gade as Rose Varon
 Aisha Hinds as Mona Gomez
 Edwin Hodge as Brett
 James Frain as Eli Szura (recurring guest star)
 Elisabeth Moss as Christina (recurring guest star)

Episodes

Reception 
Invasion received mostly positive critical reception. On review aggregator website Rotten Tomatoes, the series holds a 80% approval rating with an average rating of 8.8/10 based on 10 reviews. Metacritic gave the season a score of 72, making it generally favorable.
The show was nominated on the 32nd Saturn Awards for Best Network TV Series and Best Television Actor for William Fichtner.
It has been included in many "gone too soon" lists. In the independent web critic, Critics at large, the show was reviewed as a Lost Treasure. In 2022, Invasion was reviewed as one of the "Best Alien Invasion TV Show To Binge" by Collider. Stephen King also 
praised the series.

Legacy  
In 2010, William Fichtner singled Tom Underlay, as one of  the characters he "mostly get recognized for". He also considered his character as the one he wants to revisit:

Many actors including Eddie Cibrian, Kari Matchett, Evan Peters, Nathan Baesal and Tyler Labine singled out Invasion as one of their favorite shows they worked on. On a chat live between Bullz-eye.com and Labine, the actor says: "Invasion did get lots of love. Critics loved it. There was quite a huge following by the time we got cancelled. It was just the network didn't love it, that's all." He also praised Shaun Cassidy's writing, calling him a "mad genius". Later Labine reiterates his statement about the show's cancellation: "I still to this day don’t know why that show got canceled. We had great numbers, we had a good show, good critical acclaim… I don’t know. But it was a really fun show.

Shaun Cassidy made a similar statement about the show's cancellation: "I think there were unrealistic expectations that any show following Lost should do better. But no show after ours ever DID do better, so I suspect some of the execs may have regretted taking our show off the air." To the question "Of all the shows you’ve created that were canceled far too soon, which hurt the most ... and why?", Cassidy personally picked Invasion because "it was the most surprising".

In 2020, writer Carlos Coto, blamed the time slot for the show's cancelation: "They put us on after Lost. It made sense on paper, but audiences weren't up for two mythology-rich shows at once. Lost was awesome, but exhausting -- in a good way (and so were we)"

Broadcast history 
The series premiered on ABC  on September 21, 2005, and aired for one season. The series included twenty-two episodes, which aired Wednesday evening at 10:00pm. After the show's cancellation there were reports of a possible move to The CW, however, a deal never came to fruition.  The final episode aired on May 17, 2006. On August 22, 2006, Warner Bros. Home Entertainment released the complete first season as a six-disc DVD box set.

In the UK, the show premiered as a double bill on Channel 4, with the third episode shown shortly afterwards on 4's digital sister channel E4. In Bulgaria, Invasion premiered on February 21, 2007, on Nova Television and in Romania it premiered on March 10, 2009, on Pro Cinema movie channel. In Australia, the series premiered on the Nine Network in March 2006.

Ratings troubles 
According to Nielsen ratings, the series premiere garnered 17 million viewers airing after Lost. By the November 30, 2005 episode, the show was only garnering 10 million viewers.

For the episodes shown on January 11, 18, and 25 the Nielsen Ratings only reached 9.7 million, 9 million and 9.3 million, respectively. It had lost nearly half of the first episode's audience, far behind CBS's CSI: NY, which had 13.7 million, 15.5 million and 14.9 million, for the same period. The show was then put on hiatus for the second time, during which time it was replaced with The Evidence.

Future plotlines 
In the "August 14–20, 2006" issue of TV Guide, actor Tyler Labine relayed what creator Shaun Cassidy had planned for the following season, saying that Cassidy had said, "Larkin was going to be presumed dead. Russell and I were going to join forces against Tom. Tom was going to find out that his first wife was alive and running this whole military operation, and she was Szura's boss."

William Fichtner also relayed that storyline: "There was something in there that I thought that was so good. I discovered who it really was who was orchestrating [everything]. I didn't even see it coming from a million miles away. It was my [first wife, Grace], who got on the plane with me. Two people lived after that [1996] plane crash, not just one. She went in another direction altogether. It's amazing. It was, 'Ah, what you could have done with that.'"

In 2010, Labine gave an interview that detailed some of the ideas for the entire show. Included were plans to have Larkin coming back as an evolved hybrid/antagonist. Ultimately, the show was meant to branch into the conception of evolution vs. invasion

Soundtrack 
Invasion features an orchestral score performed by the Hollywood Studio Symphony Orchestra and composed by Jon Ehrlich and Jason Derlatka, incorporating many recurring themes and dramatic melodies. Their music was well received.  The soundtrack of the show became available on October 21, 2008 at moviescoremedia.com. The album features more than 60 minutes of carefully selected tracks from the series.

Invasion is one of Ehrlich and Derlatka's favorite works saying: "Its always a treat working with a great orchestra. We love working with Shaun Cassidy."

DVD releases

References

External links 
 

2005 American television series debuts
2006 American television series endings
2000s American science fiction television series
American Broadcasting Company original programming
English-language television shows
Television series by Warner Bros. Television Studios
Television shows set in Florida
Alien invasions in television
Television series created by Shaun Cassidy